Cirebon City Hall (Indonesian Balai Kota Cirebon) is a city hall in Cirebon City, Indonesia. The building shows implementation of the Dutch Amsterdam School Style in the colonial Dutch East Indies, now Indonesia.

History

Cirebon City Hall is designed by Joost Jacob Jiskoot (1896-1987) in Art Deco with strong influence of Amsterdam School style. Other source said the architect was H.P. Hamdl and C.F. Koll. The foundation stone was laid on June 26, 1926. The physical construction of the building began on July 1, 1926 and was completed on 1 September 1927. It was used for the town hall of the colonial city of Cheribon (also Cirebon) from 1927. It was also used for meeting place and weddings for the Europeans during colonial period.

During the Japanese Military Administration until the time of independence, the building became the center for Cirebon City Government.

Architecture
The City Hall building has three separate buildings consisting of a main building and companion buildings on the left wing and right wing. At the front of the main building is a semicircular portico. Various stained glass ornaments and lamp decoration showing influence from Nieuwe Kunst and Amsterdam School. The facade of the building is decorated with prawn sculptures designed by sculptor Anthon Maas, a reference to the city's thriving shrimp industry as well as the nickname of the city 'Kota Udang' ("shrimp city").

The Art Deco building shows strong influence of Amsterdam School movement, evident in the strong expressionist shapes in the sculptural ornaments and the expressive tapered form in the double facade (double facade is characteristic of the tropical architecture), and use of original material.

Joost Jacob Jiskoot
Jiskoot was the director of Cirebon City's Department of Public Works in 1924. During the Japanese occupation of Indonesia, he was the chief for Batavia (Jakarta)-based engineering and construction company Associatie Selle & de Bruyn, Reyerse & de Vries. During this period, he designed the residence of the mayor of Makassar (Ujung Pandang).

In the later period, he was recorded establishing the engineering and construction company Associatie NV Djakarta in 1949. The company existed until 1957 when all businesses in Indonesia was nationalized.

References

See also

Indonesian architecture
New Indies Style

Buildings and structures in Cirebon
City and town halls in Indonesia
Cultural Properties of Indonesia in West Java
Government buildings completed in 1927
1927 establishments in the Dutch East Indies
Dutch colonial architecture in Indonesia
Art Deco architecture in Indonesia